This is a list of settlements in Northern Ireland by population. The fifty largest settlements are listed. This list has been compiled from data published by the Northern Ireland Statistics and Research Agency (NISRA), based on the 2011 Census. Settlements with city status are shown in bold. Districts are local government districts as established in April 2015.

See also 
List of settlements on the island of Ireland by population
List of places in Northern Ireland
List of towns in the Republic of Ireland by population

References 

Settlements
Settlements
Northern Ireland
Northern Ireland
Localities